The 14-X is a Brazilian scramjet engine in development by the Aerothermodynamics and Hypersonics Laboratory Henry T. Nagamatsu of the Institute of Advanced Studies (IEAv) of the Department of Aerospace Science and Technology as part of the PropHiper (Portuguese: Projeto de Propulsão Hipersônica 14-X). The name is a reference to the 14-bis, of the Brazilian inventor and aviation pioneer Alberto Santos-Dumont.

The Brazilian Air Force conducted the first qualification test flight of the 14-X engine on 14 December 2021 from the Alcântara Space Center.

Development
Brazil conducts studies in the field of aspirated hypersonics since 1990s, but an development plan was conceived only in 2007, through the PropHiper project, made official by the Air Force in 2008, when the engineer-captain of the Brazilian Air Force, Tiago Cavalcanti Rolim, started a master's degree at the Instituto Tecnológico de Aeronáutica (ITA) and was approved with a thesis on the waverider configuration. The development of the project started with an experimental model by the Institute for Advanced Studies in the same year. Testing of the hypersonic engine started in October 2009.

Project details

14-X S

On 2 December 2021, the Air Force's Department of Aerospace Science and Technology (DCTA) announced the beginning of Cruzeiro Operation seeking to conduct the first flight of the 14-X. The flight date was kept confidential.

The first test flight of the 14-X scramjet engine took place at the Alcantara Space Center, using a Hypersonic Technology Demonstrator Vehicle named 14-X S . The vehicle was placed at an altitude of about 30 km by a VSB-30 booster before 14-X activation, which saw the vehicle reach an apogee of 160 km and was monitored by the tracking station of the Barreira do Inferno Launch Center in Rio Grande do Norte as it traversed a distance of roughly 200 km before dropping into a safe spot in the Atlantic Ocean.

Development of the 14-X project involves the building of four hypersonic technology demonstrator vehicles, each with its own demonstrational objectives:
14-XS: ballistic ascending flight with supersonic combustion;
14-XSP: ballistic ascending flight with aspirated hypersonic propulsion;
14-XW: Demonstration of glided flight, without propulsion, of a controllable and maneuverable hypersonic vehicle with guidance, navigation and control systems during hypersonic stratospheric flight;
14-XWP: autonomous flight of a controllable and maneuverable vehicle with active aspirated hypersonic propulsion.

Purpose
The technology is considered  by Brazil as one of the most efficient means of accessing space in the near future, and could be used to place satellites in orbit and make suborbital flights. It can also be used in other areas such as the development of intercontinental ballistic missiles with a more potent rocket or in civil aviation.

Operation history
A list with conducted operations of the 14-X:

See also

Ballistic missile
Brazilian space program
Cruise missile
Scramjet
Scramjet programs
Waverider

References

External links
IEAv website
CTA website
More about the project

Hypersonic aircraft
2020s Brazilian military aircraft
Unmanned military aircraft of Brazil
Short-range ballistic missiles
2020s Brazilian experimental aircraft